Wasco (formerly, Dewey and Deweyville) is a city in the San Joaquin Valley, in Kern County, California, United States. The population was 25,545 at the 2010 census, up from 21,263 at the 2000 census.

Wasco is the headquarters of the Tejon Indian Tribe of California, a federally recognized tribe of Kitanemuk, Yokuts, and Chumash indigenous people of California.

History
The name Dewey was in honor of Admiral George Dewey, a hero of the Spanish–American War. The Deweyville post office opened in 1899, and changed its name to Wasco in 1907.

The origin of the name Wasco is subject of two different theories: (1) That it was coined from Western American Sugar Company; and (2) that it was named by a resident from Wasco County, Oregon.

Wasco is the site of the Fourth Home Extension Colony, founded in 1907 by the American Home Extension Association.

Geography

Wasco is located on the floor of the San Joaquin Valley, at the intersection of California State Routes 43, which runs north–south, and 46, which runs east–west.

Climate
According to the Köppen Climate Classification system, Wasco has a semi-arid climate (BSk, bordering on BSh) with extremely hot, dry summers and mild to cool winters.

Demographics

2010
At the 2010 census Wasco had a population of 25,545. The racial makeup of Wasco was 12,579 (49.2%) White, 1,951 (7.6%) African American, 283 (1.1%) Native American, 180 (0.7%) Asian, 12 (0.0%) Pacific Islander, 9,714 (38.0%) from other races, and 826 (3.2%) from two or more races. Hispanic or Latino of any race were 19,585 persons (76.7%).

The census reported that 19,825 people (77.6% of the population) lived in households, 10 (0%) lived in non-institutionalized group quarters, and 5,710 (22.4%) were institutionalized.

There were 5,131 households, 3,143 (61.3%) had children under the age of 18 living in them, 2,894 (56.4%) were opposite-sex married couples living together, 992 (19.3%) had a female householder with no husband present, 484 (9.4%) had a male householder with no wife present. There were 478 (9.3%) unmarried opposite-sex partnerships, and 27 (0.5%) same-sex married couples or partnerships. 575 households (11.2%) were one person and 243 (4.7%) had someone living alone who was 65 or older. The average household size was 3.86. There were 4,370 families (85.2% of households); the average family size was 4.11.

The age distribution was 7,351 people (28.8%) under the age of 18, 3,687 people (14.4%) aged 18 to 24, 8,621 people (33.7%) aged 25 to 44, 4,593 people (18.0%) aged 45 to 64, and 1,293 people (5.1%) who were 65 or older. The median age was 28.3 years. For every 100 females, there were 160.3 males.  For every 100 females age 18 and over, there were 192.5 males.

There were 5,477 housing units at an average density of 581.1 per square mile, of the occupied units 2,680 (52.2%) were owner-occupied and 2,451 (47.8%) were rented. The homeowner vacancy rate was 5.1%; the rental vacancy rate was 4.0%. 10,486 people (41.0% of the population) lived in owner-occupied housing units and 9,339 people (36.6%) lived in rental housing units.

2000
At the 2000 census there were 21,263 people in 3,971 households, including 3,403 families, in the city. The racial makeup of the city was 34.64% White, 10.27% Black or African American, 1.02% Native American, 0.67% Asian, 0.15% Pacific Islander, 50.46% from other races, and 2.78% from two or more races.  66.72% of the population were Hispanic or Latino of any race.
Of the 3,971 households 55.1% had children under the age of 18 living with them, 62.3% were married couples living together, 16.8% had a female householder with no husband present, and 14.3% were non-families. 11.6% of households were one person and 5.7% were one person aged 65 or older. The average household size was 3.79 and the average family size was 4.07.

The age distribution was 27.4% under the age of 18, 13.9% from 18 to 24, 39.4% from 25 to 44, 13.8% from 45 to 64, and 5.4% 65 or older.  The median age was 29 years. For every 100 females, there were 183.5 males.  For every 100 females age 18 and over, there were 230.6 males.

The median income for a householder in the city was $28,997, and the median family income was $30,506. Males had a median income of $48,105 versus $18,697 for females. The per capita income for the city was $14,228.  About 24.3% of families and 27.5% of the population were below the poverty line, including 35.3% of those under age 18 and 10.1% of those age 65 or over.

People in group quarters 
Source:

 7,975 people in Wasco State Prison
 1,226 people in other types of correctional institutions
 10 people in homes for the mentally ill
 8 people in other non-institutional group quarters

Economy

One of Wasco's major economic activities is agriculture, specifically the growing of roses. Fifty-five percent of all roses grown in the United States are grown in or around Wasco.

In addition to agriculture, oil and gas extraction is a significant part of the local economy. Formerly a gas field, the region now mainly produces oil. Vintage Production, an arm of Occidental Petroleum, is the primary operator as of 2010.

The Wasco Oil Field was discovered in April 1938, by Continental Oil Company.

Sports
The Wasco Reserve are a professional baseball team competing in the independent Pecos League which is not affiliated with Major League Baseball or Minor League Baseball.  Their home games are played at Wasco Athletic Park.

Transportation
The Amtrak service, the San Joaquin, stops at the Wasco station, which has one platform next to the single track; the station building was demolished in 2021. Being on the route of the high speed rail project without a stop, Wasco city officials have expressed concerns that the Amtrak service might be discontinued. , no decision has been announced. The construction has impacted the city and the costs for asbestos removal are in dispute in a labor housing complex that had to be abandoned and demolished. While paid relocation costs, the city can’t afford to demolish the camp and wants the rail authority to pay. Chief Executive Brian Kelly came to the city to discuss the issue in 2021.

Notable people
 Pablo Garza, American mixed martial artist
 Suzanne Lacy, artist and educator
 Aaron Merz, former American football offensive lineman
 Jim Napier, former minor league baseball catcher and manager
 Manuel Quezada, professional boxer
 Carl Smith, American football coach

In popular culture 
The town is featured in Episode 133 of California's Gold with Huell Howser, filmed in 2007.

In the movie "Son in Law" featuring comedian Pauly Shore, the opening credit flyover shots and the opening graduation scene, were filmed in Wasco, CA and at the Wasco High School football stadium respectively.

See also

 Alpaugh, California
 M.V. Hartranft, land developer in Wasco

References

External links

 

1899 establishments in California
1945 establishments in California
Cities in Kern County, California
Incorporated cities and towns in California
Populated places established in 1899
Populated places established in 1945